Okpela is a dialect cluster of Edoid languages in Nigeria.

References

Edoid languages